The Microsoft Update Catalog is a website that offers updates for computers running Windows 2000 SP3, Windows XP, and Windows Server 2003 and later operating systems including Windows 10.

Scope
Created by Microsoft, the service provides a list of updates for corporations to distribute over a network. Security updates are released once a month on the website, except in special circumstances; for instance, in the event of a widespread computer virus or worm, Microsoft releases a corresponding update as soon as possible.

Gordon Mangione, Microsoft's Security Business & Technology Unit vice president (from 2004-03 to 2005-11), remarked: "Because the new services and technologies draw information and updates from a single source—the Microsoft Update catalog—and use a common polling engine (provided by the new Windows Update Agent), our customers will have a much more integrated and reliable update management process."

Usage
The latest iteration of the site was launched in August 2007, and at the time, only worked in the web browser Internet Explorer, version 6 and version 7. Before using the catalog, the user must install an ActiveX control so that they can search the updates available on the website. Searches can be saved as an RSS feed so that it can be monitored for new updates. On the Microsoft Update Catalog, downloads are accelerated with Microsoft's Background Intelligent Transfer Service, which downloads updates from the website asynchronously while attempting to use as little bandwidth as possible.

In addition, the service integrates with Windows Server Update Services and System Center Configuration Manager 2007 so that network administrators can deploy updates downloaded from the website remotely across a network.

Resurgence
As of late 2015, and the release of Windows 10, Microsoft has been making updates available exclusively through Microsoft Update Catalog. The website no longer requires an ActiveX control and can be used from any modern browser rather than being exclusive to Internet Explorer. This allows users on other platforms to download updates for archive or distribution.

See also
 Windows Server Update Services (WSUS)
 Windows Update
 Microsoft

References

External links
 

Microsoft websites